Yorkville is an unincorporated community in York Township, Dearborn County, Indiana.

History
Yorkville was laid out in 1841. It took its name from York Township.

Yorkville contained a post office between 1845 and 1955.

Services

The church in Yorkville is named St. Martin's, named after Saint Martin. It was founded in 1850

Geography

References

External links

Unincorporated communities in Dearborn County, Indiana
Unincorporated communities in Indiana
Populated places established in 1841
1841 establishments in Indiana